Statistics of Lebanese Premier League for the 1999–2000 season.

Overview
Al-Nejmeh won the championship.

League standings

References
RSSSF

Lebanon
1999–2000 in Lebanese football
Lebanese Premier League seasons
1999–2000 Lebanese Premier League